Normandy Barracks may refer to:
Normandy Barracks, Aldershot, known as New Normandy Barracks, in Aldershot, Hampshire, England
Normandy Barracks, Leconfield, home of the Defence School of Transport in East Riding of Yorkshire, England
Normandy Barracks (Germany), British Army base in North Rhine-Westphalia, Germany